Aclytia modesta is a moth of the family Erebidae. It was described by Paul Köhler in 1924. It is found in Argentina.

References

Moths described in 1924
Aclytia
Moths of South America